Susan Davis may refer to:

Susan Davis (politician) (born 1944), U.S. Representative
Susan Davis (author), American financial executive and social planner who organizes aid
Susan Davis (born 1956), British participant in the Up Series documentaries
Jeramie Rain (born Susan Davis, 1948), American actress

See also
Davis (surname)
List of people with surname Davis
Susan Davies (Paralympian), Australian archer
Susan Davies (born 1954), Australian politician
Susan Davis Wigenton, judge
Suzanne Davis (disambiguation)